Acrida is a genus of grasshoppers.

In Curiate Italian, it can also refer to:
 Roman Catholic Archdiocese of Ohrid
 Acrida (Albania), in Albania, a former suffragan bishopric and suppressed Armenian Catholic titular see